Hostile Guns is a 1967 Western starring George Montgomery, Tab Hunter and Yvonne de Carlo.

Plot

Cast
George Montgomery as Sheriff Gid McCool
Tab Hunter as Mike Reno
Yvonne De Carlo as Laura Mannon
Brian Donlevy as Marshal Willett
John Russell as Aaron Pleasant
Leo Gordon as Hank Pleasant
Robert Emhardt as R.C. Crawford
Pedro Gonzalez Gonzalez as Angel Dominguez
James Craig as Ned Cooper
Richard Arlen as Sheriff Travis
Emile Meyer as Uncle Joe Reno
Don "Red" Barry as Ed Johnson
Fuzzy Knight as Buck

See also
List of American films of 1967

External links

1967 films
1967 Western (genre) films
American Western (genre) films
Films directed by R. G. Springsteen
Films scored by Jimmie Haskell
Paramount Pictures films
1960s English-language films
1960s American films